Guðmann Þórisson (born 30 January 1987) is an Icelandic football player who currently plays for second level outfit Kórdrengir, after a spell at Fimleikafélag Hafnarfjarðar.

He started his career with Breiðablik, making his senior debut at the age of 18, before joining Norwegian outfit Nybergsund IL-Trysil in 2010. After two seasons in Norway, Guðmann returned to Iceland and joined FH on a two-year contract.

References

External links
 
 

1987 births
Living people
Association football central defenders
Gudmann Thorisson
Gudmann Thorisson
Gudmann Thorisson
Gudmann Thorisson
Gudmann Thorisson
Nybergsund IL players
Gudmann Thorisson
Gudmann Thorisson
Mjällby AIF players
Gudmann Thorisson
Gudmann Thorisson
Allsvenskan players
1. deild karla players
Gudmann Thorisson
Expatriate footballers in Norway
Gudmann Thorisson
Expatriate footballers in Sweden
Gudmann Thorisson